Jeanvoinea borneensis is a species of beetle in the family Cerambycidae. It was described by Stephan von Breuning in 1961 and was discovered in Borneo.

References

Lamiini
Beetles described in 1961